Opecoeloides is a genus of trematodes in the family Opecoelidae. It has been synonymised with Cymbephallus Linton, 1934 and Fimbriatus von Wicklen, 1946.

Species
Opecoeloides belizensis Fischthal, 1977
Opecoeloides brachyteleus Manter, 1947
Opecoeloides catarinensis Amato, 1983
Opecoeloides columbellae (Pagenstecher, 1862) Jousson & Bartoli, 2000
Opecoeloides elongatus Manter, 1947
Opecoeloides eucinostomi (Manter, 1940) von Wicklen, 1946
Opecoeloides feliciae Martorelli, 1992
Opecoeloides fimbriatus (Linton, 1934) Sogandares-Bernal & Hutton, 1959
Opecoeloides fugus Li, Qiu & Zhang, 1988
Opecoeloides furcatus (Rudolphi, 1819) Odhner, 1928
Opecoeloides manaarensis Gupta, 1956
Opecoeloides manteri (Hunninen & Cable, 1940) Hunninen & Cable, 1941
Opecoeloides melanopteri Amato, 1983
Opecoeloides pedicathedrae Travassos, Teixeira de Freitas & Bührnheim, 1966
Opecoeloides polyfimbriatus Read, 1947
Opecoeloides polynemi von Wicklen, 1946
Opecoeloides stenosomae Amato, 1983
Opecoeloides thyrinopsi (Manter, 1940) Skrjabin & Petrov, 1958
Opecoeloides vitellosus (Linton, 1900) von Wicklen, 1946

Species later synonymised with species of Opecoeloides
Opecoeloides columbellae (Pagenstecher, 1862) Jousson & Bartoli, 2000
Cercaria columbellae Pagenstecher, 1862
Opecoeloides eucinostomi (Manter, 1940) von Wicklen, 1946
Anisoporus eucinostomi Manter, 1940
Opecoeloides fimbriatus (Linton, 1934) Sogandares-Bernal & Hutton, 1959
Cymbephallus fimbriatus Linton, 1934
Opecoeloides furcatus (Rudolphi, 1819) Odhner, 1928
Distoma furcatum Rudolphi, 1819
Opecoeloides manteri (Hunninen & Cable, 1940) Hunninen & Cable, 1941
Anisoporus manteri Hunninen & Cable, 1940
Opecoeloides thyrinopsi (Manter, 1940) Skrjabin & Petrov, 1958
Anisoporus thyrinopsi Manter, 1940
Opecoeloides vitellosus (Linton, 1900) von Wicklen, 1946
Cymbephallus vitellosus (Linton, 1900) Linton, 1934
Distomum vitellosum Linton, 1900

References

Opecoelidae
Plagiorchiida genera